Anaxita sophia is a moth of the family Erebidae. It is found in Venezuela.

References

Moths described in 1901
Phaegopterina
Moths of South America